Life in Your Hands is a 1958 Soviet drama film directed by Nikolai Rozantsev.

Plot 
The film is based on the real exploits of the sappers who were able to demine the ammunition depot in Kursk...

Cast 
 Oleg Strizhenov
 Iosif Kutyansky
 Viktor Chekmaryov	
 Anatoli Yushko
 Klara Luchko
 Marina Strizhenova
 Ye. Kornilova
 Rezo Chkheidze

References

External links 
 
 Life in Your Hands on Kinopoisk

1958 films
1950s Russian-language films
Soviet comedy films
1958 comedy films